Richard Thomas Dawson, 2nd Baron Cremorne (31 August 1788 – 21 March 1827) was an Irish peer.

Biography
The only son of Richard Dawson of Dawson Grove, in 1807 he succeeded his father as heir-presumptive to his great-uncle Thomas Dawson, 1st Viscount Cremorne. He was educated at Harrow School and St John's College, Cambridge.

Dawson was elected unopposed to Parliament for County Monaghan in 1812 and sat until he succeeded as second Baron Cremorne on 1 March the following year. On 10 March 1815 he married Anne Elizabeth Emily, daughter of John Whaley of Whaley Abbey; they had two sons.

References

External links

1788 births
1827 deaths
People educated at Harrow School
Alumni of St John's College, Cambridge
UK MPs 1812–1818
UK MPs who inherited peerages
Barons in the Peerage of Ireland
Members of the Parliament of the United Kingdom for County Monaghan constituencies (1801–1922)
Richard